Mickaël Facchinetti (born 15 February 1991) is a Swiss professional footballer who plays for FC Lugano in the Swiss Super League. Facchinetti primarily plays as a left back, but has been known to play at left midfield and centre back.

Career

Club 
Facchinetti made his professional debut for Neuchâtel Xamax on May 30, 2009, when he was substituted on by coach Jean-Michel Aeby in the last game of the 2008/09 season against Lucerne. It was not until the 2010/2011 season when he would become a regular starter. It was during this season that he appeared in the 2011 Swiss Cup final, in which Xamax lost to FC Sion.

After the club were made bankrupt and removed from the Super League, he transferred to FC Lugano in 2012 but after not receiving any game time, he spent half a season at Chievo Verona on loan. However he would also not make any appearances for the Italian club. He transferred to Super League at Lausanne Sport, playing regularly when the team were relegated at the end of the 2013/14 season. After relegation with Lausanne, Facchinetti moved to FC St. Gallen for the 2014/15 season. Facchinetti would become a journeyman player over the next five years playing for five different clubs including returning to Xamax and playing in Greece with APOEL Nicosia.

Facchinetti was released by FC Sion at the start of the 2020/21 season when the club could not afford to pay his full salary during the coronavirus-enforced stoppage of football. He was picked up on a free transfer by previous club FC Lugano.

National team 
Facchinetti represented Switzerland at U20 and U21 level. His first U20 game was against Germany which the Swiss lost 2-0 on the October 7, 2010. His sole international goal was against the Italian U20 team in a 3-2 victory on the August 31, 2011.

Personal life
When Facchinetti was 18, his mother committed suicide and he had to take care of his siblings. He is of Italian descent, and of German descent through his grandmother. Facchinetti is a grandson of long-time President of Neuchâtel Xamax Gilbert Facchinetti.

Honours
APOEL
Cypriot First Division: 2018–19

Lugano
Swiss Cup: 2021–22

References

External links

Mickaël Facchinetti at Footballdatabase
Mickaël Facchinetti at Swiss football league.

1991 births
Living people
People from Neuchâtel
Swiss men's footballers
Switzerland under-21 international footballers
Switzerland youth international footballers
Swiss people of Italian descent
Swiss people of German descent
Swiss expatriate footballers
Neuchâtel Xamax FCS players
FC Lugano players
A.C. ChievoVerona players
FC Lausanne-Sport players
FC St. Gallen players
FC Thun players
APOEL FC players
FC Sion players
Swiss Super League players
Swiss Challenge League players
Cypriot First Division players
Serie A players
Association football fullbacks
Swiss expatriate sportspeople in Italy
Expatriate footballers in Italy
Swiss expatriate sportspeople in Cyprus
Expatriate footballers in Cyprus
Sportspeople from the canton of Neuchâtel